Turner is a given name derived from turning. It may refer to:

People 
Turner Ashby (1828–1862), Confederate cavalry commander in the American Civil War
Turner Barber (1893–1968), professional baseball player for the Washington Senators, Chicago Cubs and Brooklyn Robins
Turner Battle (born 1983), American former basketball point guard for the University at Buffalo Bulls
Turner Cassity (1929–2009), American poet, playwright, and short story writer
Turner Catledge (1901–1983), American journalist, best known for his work at The New York Times
Turner Gill (born 1962), currently the head football coach at Liberty University
Turner A. Gill (1841–1919), Democrat Kansas City Mayor in 1875 and 1876
Turner Layton (1894–1978), American songwriter, singer and pianist
Turner M. Marquette (1831–1894), Nebraska Republican politician, the first house representative for the state
Turner Gustavus Morehead (1814–1892), officer in the Mexican–American War and American Civil War and Brigadier General in the Union Army
Turner Saunders (1782–1854), noted Methodist preacher
Turner Stevenson (born 1972), Canadian former professional ice hockey right winger for the Montreal Canadiens, New Jersey Devils, and Philadelphia Flyers
Turner Ward (born 1965), former professional baseball player

Fictional characters 
 Turner, a character from the Simon Kidgits Club. Developed by Simon Brand Ventures

See also 
Turner (disambiguation)
Turner (surname)